

Events

Pre-1600
1145 – The main altar of Lund Cathedral, at the time seat of the archiepiscopal see of all the Nordic countries, is consecrated.
1173 – The widow Stamira sacrifices herself in order to raise the siege of Ancona by the forces of Emperor Frederick Barbarossa.
1355 – King Tvrtko I of Bosnia writes In castro nostro Vizoka vocatum from the Old town of Visoki.
1420 – A 9.4 MS-strong earthquake shakes Chile's Atacama Region causing tsunamis in Chile as well as Hawaii and Japan. 
1449 – Tumu Crisis: The Mongols capture the Emperor of China.
1529 – The Spanish fort of Sancti Spiritu, the first one built in modern Argentina, is destroyed by natives.
1532 – Lady Anne Boleyn is made Marquess of Pembroke by her fiancé, King Henry VIII of England.

1601–1900
1604 – Adi Granth, now known as Guru Granth Sahib, the holy scripture of Sikhs, is first installed at Harmandir Sahib.
1644 – Battle of Tippermuir: James Graham, 1st Marquess of Montrose defeats the Earl of Wemyss's Covenanters, reviving the Royalist cause.
1645 – English Civil War. Scottish Covenanter forces abandon their month-long Siege of Hereford, a Cavalier stronghold, on news of Royalist victories in Scotland.
1715 – At the age of five, Louis XV becomes king of France in succession to his great-grandfather, King Louis XIV.
1763 – Catherine II of Russia endorses Ivan Betskoy's plans for a Foundling Home in Moscow.
1772 – The Mission San Luis Obispo de Tolosa is founded in San Luis Obispo, California.
1774 – Massachusetts Bay colonists rise up in the bloodless Powder Alarm.
1804 – Juno, one of the largest asteroids in the Main Belt, is discovered by the German astronomer Karl Ludwig Harding.
1831 – The Order of St. Gregory the Great is established by Pope Gregory XVI of the Vatican State to recognize high support for the Vatican or for the Pope, by a man or a woman, and not necessarily a Roman Catholic.
1836 – Narcissa Whitman, one of the first English-speaking white women to settle west of the Rocky Mountains, arrives at Walla Walla, Washington.
1838 – Saint Andrew's Scots School, the oldest school of British origin in South America, is established.
1862 – American Civil War: Battle of Chantilly: Confederate Army troops defeat a group of retreating Union Army troops in Chantilly, Virginia.
1864 – American Civil War: The Confederate Army General John Bell Hood orders the evacuation of Atlanta, ending a four-month siege by General William Tecumseh Sherman.
1870 – Franco-Prussian War: The Battle of Sedan is fought, resulting in a decisive Prussian victory.
1873 – Cetshwayo ascends to the throne as king of the Zulu nation following the death of his father Mpande.
1878 – Emma Nutt becomes the world's first female telephone operator when she is recruited by Alexander Graham Bell to the Boston Telephone Dispatch Company.
1880 – The army of Mohammad Ayub Khan is routed by the British at the Battle of Kandahar, ending the Second Anglo-Afghan War.
1894 – Over 400 people die in the Great Hinckley Fire, a forest fire in Hinckley, Minnesota.
1897 – The Tremont Street Subway in Boston opens, becoming the first underground rapid transit system in North America.

1901–present
1923 – The Great Kantō earthquake devastates Tokyo and Yokohama, killing about 105,000 people.
1939 – World War II: Nazi Germany and Slovakia invade Poland, beginning the European phase of World War II.
  1961   – TWA Flight 529 crashed shortly after takeoff from Midway Airport in Chicago, killing all 78 people on board. At the time, it was the deadliest single plane disaster in U.S. history.
  1967   – Six-Day War: The Khartoum Resolution is issued at the Arab Summit, and eight countries adopt the "three 'no's against Israel".
1969 – A coup in Libya brings Muammar Gaddafi to power.
1973 – A 76-hour multinational rescue effort in the Celtic Sea resulted in the Rescue of Roger Mallinson and Roger Chapman.
1981 – Central African President David Dacko is ousted from power in a bloodless military coup led by General André Kolingba.
1982 – The United States Air Force Space Command is founded.
1983 – Cold War: Korean Air Lines Flight 007 is shot down by a Soviet Union jet fighter when the commercial aircraft enters Soviet airspace, killing all 269 on board, including Congressman Lawrence McDonald.
2004 – The Beslan school siege begins when armed terrorists take schoolchildren and school staff hostage in North Ossetia, Russia; by the end of the siege, three days later, more than 385 people are dead (including hostages, other civilians, security personnel and terrorists).
2008 – Iraq War: The United States Armed Forces transfers control of Anbar Province to the Iraqi Armed Forces.

Births

Pre-1600
 948 – Jing Zong, emperor of the Liao Dynasty (d. 982)
1145 – Ibn Jubayr, Arab geographer and poet (d. 1217)
1288 – Elizabeth Richeza of Poland (d. 1335)
1341 – Frederick III the Simple, King of Sicily (d. 1377)
1453 – Gonzalo Fernández de Córdoba, Spanish general (d. 1515)
1477 – Bartolomeo Fanfulla, Italian mercenary (d. 1525)
1561 – Gervase Helwys, English murderer (d. 1615)
1566 – Edward Alleyn, English actor and major figure of the Elizabethan theatre; founder of Dulwich College and Alleyn's School (d. 1626)
1577 – Scipione Borghese, Italian cardinal and art collector (d. 1633)
1579 – John Frederick of Holstein-Gottorp, Prince-Bishop, Roman Catholic archbishop (d. 1634)
1588 – Henri, Prince of Condé (d. 1646)
1592 – Maria Angela Astorch, Spanish mystic and saint (d. 1665)

1601–1900
1606 – Nicholas Slanning, English politician (d. 1643)
1608 – Giacomo Torelli, Italian stage designer, engineer, and architect (d. 1678)
1647 – Princess Anna Sophie of Denmark, daughter of King Frederick III of Denmark (d. 1717)
1653 – Johann Pachelbel, German organist, composer, and educator (d. 1706)
1689 – Kilian Ignaz Dientzenhofer, Bohemian architect, designed Ss. Cyril and Methodius Cathedral (d. 1751)
1711 – William IV, Prince of Orange (d. 1751)
1726 – Johann Becker, German organist, composer, and educator (d. 1803)
1795 – James Gordon Bennett Sr., American publisher, founded the New York Herald (d. 1872)
1799 – Ferenc Gyulay, Hungarian-Austrian commander and politician (d. 1868)
1811 – James Montgomrey, Leader and important benefactor of his home town of Brentford, England (d. 1883)
1818 – José María Castro Madriz, Costa Rican lawyer and politician, 1st President of Costa Rica (d. 1892)
1848 – Auguste Forel, Swiss myrmecologist, neuroanatomist, and psychiatrist (d. 1931)
1850 – Jim O'Rourke, American baseball player and manager (d. 1919)
1851 – John Clum, American journalist and agent (d. 1932)
1853 – Aleksei Brusilov, Russian general (d. 1926)
1854 – Engelbert Humperdinck, German playwright and composer (d. 1921)
1855 – Innokenty Annensky, Russian poet and critic (d. 1909)
1856 – Sergei Winogradsky, Ukrainian-Russian microbiologist and ecologist (d. 1953)
1864 – Akashi Motojiro, Japanese general (d. 1919)
1866 – James J. Corbett, American boxer (d. 1933)
1867 – John Gretton, 1st Baron Gretton, English sailor and politician (d. 1947)
1868 – Henri Bourassa, Canadian publisher and politician (d. 1952)
1871 – J. Reuben Clark, American lawyer, civil servant, and religious leader (d. 1961)
1875 – Edgar Rice Burroughs, American author (d. 1950)
1876 – Harriet Shaw Weaver, English journalist and activist (d. 1961)
1877 – Francis William Aston, English chemist and physicist, Nobel Prize laureate (d. 1945)
  1877   – Rex Beach, American author, playwright, and water polo player (d. 1949)
1878 – Princess Alexandra of Saxe-Coburg and Gotha (d. 1942)
  1878   – J. F. C. Fuller, English general and historian (d. 1966)
  1878   – Tullio Serafin, Italian conductor and director (d. 1968)
1883 – Didier Pitre, Canadian ice hockey player (d. 1934)
1884 – Hilda Rix Nicholas, Australian artist (d. 1961)
  1884   – Sigurd Wallén, Swedish actor and director (d. 1947)
1886 – Othmar Schoeck, Swiss composer and conductor (d. 1957)
  1886   – Shigeyasu Suzuki, Japanese general (d. 1957)
1887 – Blaise Cendrars, Swiss author and poet (d. 1961)
1892 – Leverett Saltonstall, American lieutenant and politician, 55th Governor of Massachusetts (d. 1979)
1893 – Yasuo Kuniyoshi, Japanese-American painter and photographer (d. 1953)
1895 – Engelbert Zaschka, German engineer and designer, invented the Human-powered aircraft (d. 1955)
1896 – A. C. Bhaktivedanta Swami Prabhupada, Indian religious leader, founded the International Society for Krishna Consciousness (d. 1977)
1897 – Andy Kennedy, Irish footballer (d. 1963)
1898 – Violet Carson, English actress and singer (d. 1983)
1899 – Richard Arlen, American actor (d. 1976)

1901–present
1902 – Kazimierz Dąbrowski, Polish psychiatrist and psychologist (d. 1980)
1904 – Johnny Mack Brown, American football player and actor (d. 1974)
1905 – Father Chrysanthus, Dutch arachnologist (d. 1972)
1906 – Joaquín Balaguer, Dominican lawyer and politician, 49th President of the Dominican Republic (d. 2002)
  1906   – Franz Biebl, German composer and educator (d. 2001)
  1906   – Eleanor Hibbert, English author (d. 1993)
  1906   – Arthur Rowe, English footballer and manager (d. 1993)
1907 – Gil Puyat, Filipino businessman and politician (d. 1981)
1908 – Amir Elahi, Pakistani cricketer (d. 1980)
  1908   – Lou Kenton, English social activist (d. 2012)
1909 – E. Herbert Norman, Canadian historian and diplomat (d. 1957)
1913 – Ludwig Merwart, Austrian painter and illustrator (d. 1979)
1914 – John H. Adams, American jockey (d. 1995)
1916 – Dorothy Cheney, American tennis player (d. 2014)
1919 – Ossie Dawson, South African cricketer (d. 2008)
  1919   – Hilda Hänchen, German physicist and academic (d. 2013)
1920 – Liz Carpenter, American journalist, author and activist (d. 2010)
  1920   – Eduardo J. Corso, Uruguayan lawyer and journalist (d. 2012)
  1920   – Richard Farnsworth, American actor and stuntman (d. 2000)
1921 – Willem Frederik Hermans, Dutch author, poet and playwright (d. 1995)
1922 – Yvonne De Carlo, Canadian-American actress and singer (d. 2007)
  1922   – Vittorio Gassman, Italian actor, director and screenwriter (d. 2000)
1923 – Rocky Marciano, American boxer (d. 1969)
  1923   – Kenneth Thomson, 2nd Baron Thomson of Fleet, Canadian businessman and art collector (d. 2006)
1924 – Hal Douglas, American voice actor (d. 2014)
1925 – Arvonne Fraser, American activist (d. 2018)
  1925   – Art Pepper, American saxophonist, clarinet player and composer (d. 1982)
1926 – Abdur Rahman Biswas, Bangladeshi banker and politician, 10th President of Bangladesh (d. 2017)
  1926   – Gene Colan, American illustrator (d. 2011)
  1926   – Russell Jones, Australian ice hockey player and coach (d. 2012)
1927 – Soshana Afroyim, Austrian painter (d. 2015)
  1927   – Wyatt Cooper, American author and screenwriter (d. 1978)
1929 – Mava Lee Thomas, American baseball player (d. 2013)
  1929   – Maurice Vachon, Canadian wrestler (d. 2013)
1930 – Turgut Özakman, Turkish lawyer and civil servant (d. 2013)
  1930   – Dick Raaymakers, Dutch composer and theorist (d. 2013)
  1930   – Charles Correa, Indian architect (d. 2015)
1931 – Abdul Haq Ansari, Indian theologian and scholar (d. 2012)
  1931   – Beano Cook, American journalist and sportscaster (d. 2012)
  1931   – Cecil Parkinson, English accountant and politician, Secretary of State for Transport (d. 2016)
  1931   – Boxcar Willie, American singer-songwriter and guitarist (d. 1999)
1932 – Derog Gioura, Nauruan politician, 23rd President of Nauru (d. 2008)
1933 – Marshall Lytle, American bass player and songwriter  (d. 2013)
  1933   – Ann Richards, American educator and politician, 45th Governor of Texas (d. 2006)
  1933   – T. Thirunavukarasu, Sri Lankan politician (d. 1982)
  1933   – Conway Twitty, American singer-songwriter and guitarist (d. 1993)
1935 – Nicholas Garland, English cartoonist
  1935   – Seiji Ozawa, Japanese conductor and director
  1935   – Guy Rodgers, American basketball player (d. 2001)
1936 – Valery Legasov, Soviet inorganic chemist, chief of the commission investigating the Chernobyl disaster (d. 1988)
1938 – Alan Dershowitz, American lawyer and author
  1938   – Per Kirkeby, Danish painter, sculptor and poet (d. 2018)
1939 – Lily Tomlin, American actress, comedian, screenwriter and producer
1940 – Yaşar Büyükanıt, Turkish general (d. 2019)
 1940  – Annie Ernaux, French author, Nobel Prize laureate
1942 – C. J. Cherryh, American author and educator
1944 – Archie Bell, American soul singer-songwriter and musician 
  1944   – Leonard Slatkin, American conductor and composer
1945 – Abd Rabbuh Mansur Hadi, Yemeni general and politician, 2nd President of Yemen
1946 – Barry Gibb, Manx-English singer-songwriter and producer 
  1946   – Shalom Hanoch, Israeli rock singer, lyricist and composer
  1946   – Roh Moo-hyun, South Korean soldier and politician, 9th President of South Korea (d. 2009)
1947 – Al Green, American lawyer and politician
  1947   – P. A. Sangma, Indian lawyer and politician, 11th Speaker of the Lok Sabha (d. 2016)
1948 – Greg Errico, American drummer and producer 
  1948   – Józef Życiński, Polish archbishop and philosopher (d. 2011)
  1948   – Russ Kunkel, American drummer and producer
1949 – Garry Maddox, American baseball player and sportscaster
  1949   – Alasdair McDonnell, Irish physician and politician
1950 – Mikhail Fradkov, Russian politician, 36th Prime Minister of Russia
  1950   – Phillip Fulmer, American football player and coach
  1950   – Phil McGraw, American psychologist, author and talk show host
1951 – David Bairstow, English cricketer and sportscaster (d. 1998)
1952 – Michael Massee, American actor (d. 2016)
  1952   – Manuel Piñero, Spanish golfer
1953 – Don Blackman, American singer-songwriter, pianist and producer (d. 2013)
1954 – Dave Lumley, Canadian ice hockey player
1955 – Bruce Foxton, English singer-songwriter and bass player 
1956 – Vinnie Johnson, American basketball player and sportscaster
  1956   – Bernie Wagenblast, American publisher, founder of Transportation Communications Newsletter
1957 – Alexandra Aikhenvald, Australian linguist 
  1957   – Gloria Estefan, Cuban-American singer-songwriter and actress
  1957   – Duško Ivanović, Montenegrin basketball player and coach
1959 – Mike Duxbury, English footballer
1960 – Ralf Außem, German footballer and manager
  1960   – Karl Mecklenburg, American football player
1961 – Pete DeCoursey, American journalist (d. 2014)
  1961   – Jeremy Farrar, British academic and educator; director of the Wellcome Trust
  1961   – Christopher Ferguson, American captain, pilot and astronaut
  1961   – Boney James, American saxophonist, composer and producer
1962 – Tony Cascarino, English-Irish footballer
  1962   – Ruud Gullit, Dutch footballer and manager
1963 – Stephen Kernahan, Australian footballer
1964 – Brian Bellows, Canadian ice hockey player
  1964   – Holly Golightly, American author and illustrator
  1964   – Dave O'Higgins, English jazz saxophonist
  1964   – Charlie Robison, American singer-songwriter and guitarist
1965 – Craig McLachlan, Australian actor and singer
  1965   – Tibor Simon, Hungarian footballer and manager (d. 2002)
1966 – Tim Hardaway, American basketball player and coach
  1966   – Ken Levine, American video game designer, co-founded Irrational Games
1967 – Steve Pemberton, English actor, screenwriter and director
  1967   – David Whissell, Canadian engineer and politician
1968 – Mohamed Atta, Egyptian terrorist (d. 2001)
1969 – Henning Berg, Norwegian footballer and manager
1970 – David Fairleigh, Australian rugby league player, coach and sportscaster
  1970   – Hwang Jung-min, South Korean actor
  1970   – Padma Lakshmi, Indian-American actress and author
1971 – Joe Enochs, American soccer player and manager
  1971   – Yoshitaka Hirota, Japanese bass player and composer
  1971   – Hakan Şükür, Turkish footballer and politician
1973 – J.D. Fortune, Canadian singer-songwriter 
  1973   – Rieko Miura, Japanese singer and actress
  1973   – Simon Shaw, English rugby player 
  1973   – Zach Thomas, American football player
  1973   – Ram Kapoor, Indian actor
1974 – Burn Gorman, American-born English actor and musician
  1974   – Jason Taylor, American football player and sportscaster
  1974   – Yutaka Yamamoto, Japanese director and producer, founder of Ordet Animation Studio
  1974   – Jhonen Vasquez, American writer, director, cartoonist and comic illustrator
1975 – Natalie Bassingthwaighte, Australian singer-songwriter 
  1975   – James Innes, English entrepreneur and author
  1975   – Nomy Lamm, American singer-songwriter and activist
  1975   – Cuttino Mobley, American basketball player
  1975   – Scott Speedman, English-Canadian actor
1976 – Babydaddy, American singer-songwriter and producer 
  1976   – Marcos Ambrose, Australian racing driver
  1976   – Clare Connor, English cricketer
  1976   – Érik Morales, Mexican boxer
  1976   – Sebastián Rozental, Chilean footballer
1977 – David Albelda, Spanish footballer
  1977   – Raffaele Giammaria, Italian racing driver
  1977   – Arsalan Iftikhar, American lawyer and author
  1977   – Aaron Schobel, American football player
1978 – Max Vieri, Australian-Italian footballer
1980 – Sammy Adjei, Ghanaian footballer
  1980   – Chris Riggott, English footballer
1981 – Clinton Portis, American football player
  1981   – Adam Quick, Australian basketball player
1982 – Jeffrey Buttle, Canadian figure skater
  1982   – Paul Dumbrell, Australian racing driver
  1982   – Ryan Gomes, American basketball player
1983 – Iñaki Lejarreta, Spanish cyclist (d. 2012)
  1983   – José Antonio Reyes, Spanish footballer (d. 2019)
  1983   – Jeff Woywitka, Canadian ice hockey player
1984 – Ludwig Göransson, Swedish film composer
  1984   – László Köteles, Hungarian footballer
  1984   – Nick Noble, American football player
  1984   – Rod Pelley, Canadian ice hockey player
  1984   – Joe Trohman, American singer-songwriter, guitarist and producer 
1985 – Larsen Jensen, American swimmer
1986 – Anthony Allen, English rugby player
  1986   – Gaël Monfils,  French tennis player
  1986   – Stella Mwangi, Kenyan-Norwegian singer-songwriter
1987 – Leonel Suárez, Cuban decathlete
  1987   – Mats Zuccarello, Norwegian ice hockey player
1988 – Simona de Silvestro, Swiss racing driver
  1988   – Chanel West Coast, American rapper-songwriter and model
1989 – Astrid Besser, Italian tennis player
  1989   – Jefferson Montero, Ecuadorian footballer
1990 – Stanislav Tecl, Czech footballer
1991 – Rhys Bennett, English footballer
1992 – Cristiano Biraghi, Italian footballer
  1992   – Kirani James, Grenadian sprinter
  1992   – Woo Hye-lim, South Korean singer-songwriter
1993 – Mario Lemina, Gabonese footballer
1994 – Anna Smolina, Russian tennis player
  1994   – Carlos Sainz Jr., Spanish Formula One driver 
1996 – Zendaya, American actress and singer
1997 –  Jeon Jungkook, South Korean singer, songwriter and record producer
  1997   – Joan Mir, Spanish motorcycle racer
2002 – Diane Parry, French tennis player
2003 – An Yu-jin, South Korean singer and actress

Deaths

Pre-1600
 870 – Muhammad al-Bukhari, Persian scholar (b. 810)
1081 – Bishop Eusebius of Angers
1159 – Pope Adrian IV (b. 1100)
1198 – Dulce, Queen of Portugal (b. 1160)
1215 – Otto, bishop of Utrecht
1256 – Kujō Yoritsune, Japanese shōgun (b. 1218)
1327 – Foulques de Villaret, Grand Master of the Knights Hospitaller
1339 – Henry XIV, Duke of Bavaria (b. 1305)
1376 – Philip of Valois, Duke of Orléans (b. 1336)
1414 – William de Ros, 6th Baron de Ros, English politician, Lord High Treasurer (b. 1369)
1480 – Ulrich V, Count of Württemberg (b. 1413)
1557 – Jacques Cartier, French navigator and explorer (b. 1491)
1581 – Guru Ram Das, Sikh 4th of the Ten Gurus of Sikhism (b. 1534)
1599 – Cornelis de Houtman, Dutch explorer (b.1565)

1601–1900
1615 – Étienne Pasquier, French lawyer and jurist (b. 1529)
1646 – Francis Windebank, English statesman (b. 1582)
1648 – Marin Mersenne, French mathematician, theologian, and philosopher (b. 1588)
1678 – Jan Brueghel the Younger, Flemish painter (b. 1601)
1685 – Leoline Jenkins, Welsh lawyer, jurist, and politician, Secretary of State for the Northern Department (b. 1625)
1687 – Henry More, English priest and philosopher (b. 1614)
1706 – Cornelis de Man, Dutch painter (b. 1621)
1715 – François Girardon, French sculptor (b. 1628)
  1715   – Louis XIV of France (b. 1638)
1838 – William Clark, American soldier, explorer, and politician, 4th Governor of Missouri Territory (b. 1770)
1839 – Izidor Guzmics, Hungarian theologian and educator (b. 1786)
1868 – Ferenc Gyulay, Hungarian-Austrian commander and politician (b. 1799)

1901–present
1922 – Samu Pecz, Hungarian architect and academic (b. 1854)
1930 – Peeter Põld, Estonian scientist and politician, 1st Estonian Minister of Education (b. 1878)
1943 – Charles Atangana, Cameroonian ruler (b. 1880)
1947 – Frederick Russell Burnham, American soldier and adventurer (b. 1861)
1951 – Nellie McClung, Canadian author and suffragist (b. 1873)
1967 – Siegfried Sassoon, English soldier and writer (b. 1886)
1969 – Drew Pearson, American journalist and author (b. 1897)
1970 – François Mauriac, French novelist, poet, and playwright, Nobel Prize laureate (b. 1885)
1971 – Alan Brown, English soldier (b. 1909)
1974 – Gerd Neggo, Estonian dancer, dance teacher, and choreographer (b. 1891)
1977 – Ethel Waters, American singer and actress (b. 1896)
1981 – Ann Harding, American actress (b. 1901)
  1981   – Albert Speer, German architect and author (b. 1905)
1982 – Haskell Curry, American mathematician and academic (b. 1900)
  1982   – Władysław Gomułka, Polish activist and politician (b. 1905)
1983 – Henry M. Jackson, American lawyer and politician (b. 1912)
  1983   – Larry McDonald, American physician and politician (b. 1935)
1984 – Madeleine de Bourbon-Busset, Duchess of Parma (b. 1898)
1985 – Stefan Bellof, German racing driver (b. 1957)
1986 – Murray Hamilton, American actor (b. 1923)
1988 – Luis Walter Alvarez, American physicist and academic, Nobel Prize laureate (b. 1911)
1989 – A. Bartlett Giamatti, American businessman and academic (b. 1938)
  1989   – Kazimierz Deyna, Polish footballer (b. 1947)
  1989   – Tadeusz Sendzimir, Polish-American engineer (b. 1894)
1990 – Edwin O. Reischauer, American scholar and diplomat (b. 1910)
1991 – Otl Aicher, German graphic designer and typographer (b. 1922)
1997 – Zoltán Czibor, Hungarian footballer (b. 1929)
1998 – Józef Krupiński, Polish poet and author (b. 1930)
  1998   – Cary Middlecoff, American golfer and sportscaster (b. 1921)
  1998   – Osman F. Seden, Turkish director, producer, and screenwriter (b. 1924)
1999 – W. Richard Stevens, Zambian computer scientist and author (b. 1951)
2003 – Rand Brooks, American actor and producer (b. 1918)
  2003   – Terry Frost, English painter and academic (b. 1915)
2004 – Ahmed Kuftaro, Syrian religious leader, Grand Mufti of Syria (b. 1915)
  2004   – Alastair Morton, South African businessman (b. 1938)
2005 – R. L. Burnside, American singer-songwriter and guitarist (b. 1926)
2006 – György Faludy, Hungarian author and poet (b. 1910)
  2006   – Warren Mitofsky, American journalist (b. 1934)
  2006   – Bob O'Connor, American businessman and politician, 57th Mayor of Pittsburgh (b. 1944)
  2006   – Kyffin Williams, Welsh painter and educator (b. 1918)
2007 – Roy McKenzie, New Zealand horse racer and philanthropist (b. 1922)
2008 – Thomas J. Bata, Czech-Canadian businessman (b. 1914)
  2008   – Jerry Reed, American singer-songwriter, guitarist, and actor (b. 1937)
2010 – Wakanohana Kanji I, Japanese sumo wrestler, the 45th Yokozuna (b. 1928)
2012 – Sean Bergin, South African saxophonist, flute player, and composer (b. 1948)
  2012   – Hal David, American songwriter and composer (b. 1921)
  2012   – Smarck Michel, Haitian businessman and politician, 6th Prime Minister of Haiti (b. 1937)
  2012   – William Petzäll, Swedish politician (b. 1988)
  2012   – Arnaldo Putzu, Italian illustrator (b. 1927)
2013 – Ignacio Eizaguirre, Spanish footballer and manager (b. 1920)
  2013   – Gordon Steege, Australian soldier (b. 1917)
  2013   – Margaret Mary Vojtko, American linguist and academic (b. 1930)
  2013   – Ken Wallis, English commander and pilot (b. 1916)
2014 – Ahmed Abdi Godane, Somali militant leader (b. 1977)
  2014   – Roger McKee, American baseball player (b. 1926)
  2014   – Joseph Shivers, American chemist and academic, developed spandex (b. 1920)
2015 – Gurgen Dalibaltayan, Armenian general (b. 1926)
  2015   – Dean Jones, American actor and singer (b. 1931)
  2015   – Richard G. Hewlett, American historian and author (b. 1923)
  2015   – Ben Kuroki, American sergeant and pilot (b. 1917)
2018 – Randy Weston, American jazz pianist and composer (b. 1926)
2020 – Erick Morillo, American disc jockey and music producer (b. 1971)
2022 – Barbara Ehrenreich, American writer and journalist (b. 1941)
2022 – Yang Yongsong, Chinese major general (b. 1919)

Holidays and observances
Christian feast day:
Constantius (Costanzo) of Aquino
David Pendleton Oakerhater (Anglican Communion) 
Giles
Loup (Lupus) of Sens
Nivard (Nivo)
Sixtus of Reims
Terentian (Terrence)
Verena
Vibiana
The beginning of the new liturgical year (Eastern Orthodox Church and the Eastern Catholic Church)
September 1 (Eastern Orthodox liturgics)
Knowledge Day (Former Soviet Union)
Anniversary of Al Fateh Revolution (Gaddafists in Libya)
Wattle Day (Australia)

References

External links

 
 
 

Days of the year
September